Moira Forbes (born July 19, 1979) is an American journalist and member of the Forbes publishing family.

Early life
Moira Forbes is the daughter of Steve Forbes, who was a former Republican presidential candidate and the chairman and editor-in-chief of Forbes. She is also the granddaughter of Malcolm Forbes. She attended St. Andrew's School in Delaware and holds a B.A. cum laudein art history from Princeton University. She attended Harvard Business School's Program for Leadership Development.

Career
She first joined Forbes Media in 2001 in its London office, overseeing marketing initiatives for the magazine's European edition. She relocated to the company's New York headquarters in 2003, and was named Associate Publisher of Forbes's lifestyle magazine, Forbes Life, the following year. In 2008, Forbes helped launch ForbesWoman, a multi-media platform that includes a website, digital community and a variety of forums and live events. The following year, she founded the Forbes Executive Women's Board, a national organization dedicated to "harnessing the collective power of women in business to drive sustainable change."

She is the publisher of ForbesWoman, a quarterly magazine and website of Forbes Media LLC dedicated to women in business and leadership. She also serves as a Forbes columnist, focusing on issues for career women and profiling women for Forbes Magazine's List of The World's 100 Most Powerful Women. In 2009, Success with Moira Forbes was launched on the Forbes Video Network. The bi-weekly series has featured guests such as Sheryl Sandberg, Oprah Winfrey, Arianna Huffington, and Donna Karan. Forbes is also a frequent keynote speaker, host and moderator for women's gatherings around the world.

Personal life
She married an Australian-born orthopaedic surgeon, John Anderson, in 2008, has two children, and they reside in New York City.

References

Living people
1979 births
Princeton University alumni
Writers from Philadelphia
American women journalists
Moira
Journalists from New York City
Journalists from Pennsylvania
21st-century American women